Michael McElhatton (born 16 April 1975 in Killarney) is an Irish former footballer.

Playing career
McElhatton began his career with AFC Bournemouth, progressing from the youth ranks to the first-team. After a spell with Scarborough from 1996–1998, he switched to Conference side Rushden & Diamonds, where he would play for four years. A serious knee injury during this period, limited his action after Rushden were promoted to The Football League in 2001.

In February 2002 McElhatton joined Chester City on loan, with his two-month stint with the club including two superbly taken goals in a 4–0 win at Stalybridge Celtic. He never made another senior appearance after helping Chester win 2–0 at Forest Green Rovers in April 2002, as his persistent knee problems led him to retire from football at the age of 27

External links

Rushden & Diamonds career profile

References

1975 births
Living people
People from Killarney
Association footballers from County Kerry
English Football League players
National League (English football) players
Republic of Ireland association footballers
Association football midfielders
AFC Bournemouth players
Scarborough F.C. players
Rushden & Diamonds F.C. players
Chester City F.C. players